José Luis García (born January 7, 1985) is a retired Major League Baseball pitcher who played for the Florida Marlins in 2006.

García spent part of two seasons in minor league baseball for the Florida Marlins before making his major league debut on September 11, . In six different minor league levels, he posted a 16–15 record with 248 strikeouts and a 3.37 ERA in 40 starts. He made five appearances for Florida, giving up six runs with eight strikeouts and a 4.91 ERA in 11.0 innings of relief work.

García also represented the Marlins in the 2006 All-Star Futures Game at PNC Park.

Garcia was sidelined for the  season after undergoing Tommy John surgery. He was claimed off waivers by the Oakland Athletics on October 11, 2007. On December 5, 2007, Garcia was designated for assignment. Garcia became a free agent at the end of the  season, after playing in only 11 games in 2008.

External links

1985 births
Living people
Águilas Cibaeñas players
Albuquerque Isotopes players
Arizona League Athletics players
Carolina Mudcats players
Dominican Republic expatriate baseball players in the United States
Florida Marlins players
Greensboro Grasshoppers players
Gulf Coast Marlins players
Jupiter Hammerheads players

Major League Baseball pitchers
Major League Baseball players from the Dominican Republic
Midland RockHounds players
People from Dajabón
Sacramento River Cats players